Natalia Bobrova (24 August 1978 – 2 April 2015) was an artistic gymnast from Russia. She won the bronze medal on floor exercise at the 1993 World Championships, the first women's world championship medal for independent Russia. She died of stomach cancer in Tel Aviv in April 2015.

Competitive history

References

1978 births
2015 deaths
Russian female artistic gymnasts
Deaths from cancer in Israel
Deaths from stomach cancer
Medalists at the World Artistic Gymnastics Championships